This was a new event in 2012. Elena Bovina and Mirjana Lučić won the title, defeating Mariana Duque and Adriana Pérez in the final, 6–3, 4–6, [10–8].

Seeds

Draw

References 
 Main draw

John Newcombe Women's Pro Challenge - Doubles